Nomaza Nongqunga Coupez was born in South Africa, in 1981. She is the founder of the company Undiscover Canvass which promotes African artists in France. Since August 2017, she has also been a member of the Presidential Council for Africa.

Biography
Coupez holds a bachelor's degree from Bloemfontein Tecknikon. She relocated to France in 2009, where she began promoting African culture and helping young African artists gain visibility on the European market.

In 2015, she presented her first art exhibition. Coupez then founded Undiscover Canvass to promote African artists in France, and to collaborate with the film and wine industry in South Africa.

She joined the Presidential Council for Africa, an advisory organisation created by French president Emmanuel Macron.

References

South African women business executives
Living people
South African women company founders
21st-century South African businesswomen
21st-century South African businesspeople
Year of birth missing (living people)